The Hutan shrew (Crocidura hutanis) is a species of mammal in the family Soricidae. It is known only from northern Sumatra in Indonesia.

References

Crocidura
Mammals described in 1995